Baryssinus marisae is a species of longhorn beetle in the family Cerambycidae. It was described by Martins & Monné in 1974.

References

Baryssinus
Beetles described in 1974